Major-General Harold Francis Salt  (30 December 1879 – 10 August 1971) was a senior British Army officer.

Salt was the youngest son of Sir Titus Salt, 1st Baronet. He was commissioned into the Royal Regiment of Artillery in 1900. He served in the First World War, being promoted to Brigade Major in March 1915. His appointments as a Staff Officer saw him deployed on a variety of fronts, such as the Western Front, Gallipoli, Salonika, Palestine and Syria. He finished the war with the temporary rank of Brigadier-General. He was awarded the Distinguished Service Order in 1918 and made a Companion of the Order of St Michael and St George in 1919.

He was Assistant Commandant at the Royal Military Academy, Woolwich between 1925 and 1929, Commander Royal Artillery in the 54th (East Anglian) Infantry Division between 1930 and 1931, and Commander of the Territorial Army Air Defence Formations from 1931 to 1935. He was made a Companion of the Order of the Bath in 1932. He subsequently held military appointments in India until his retirement in April 1939.

Salt married Phyllis Dulce Cameron on 5 August 1914, and together they had one child.

References 

1879 births
1971 deaths
Royal Artillery officers
British Army generals of World War I
Companions of the Order of the Bath
Companions of the Order of St Michael and St George
Companions of the Distinguished Service Order
Recipients of the Croix de Guerre 1914–1918 (France)